Giuseppe Allamano (21 January 1851 – 16 February 1926) was an Italian Roman Catholic priest. He established the Consolata Missionaries (I.M.C.) congregation for males and another for females, known as the Consolata Missionary Sisters. Allamano also served as the rector of the Santuario della Consolata and transformed the shrine into a source of spiritual renewal for the faithful.

He was beatified (the last stage before canonization) on 7 October 1990.

Life 

Giuseppe Ottavio Allamano was born in Asti in 1851 as the fourth of five children to Joseph and Marianna Cafasso Allamano. His mother was the younger sister of Joseph Cafasso. His father died of anthrax when Giuseppe was three.

From 1861 to 1866 Allamano attended the Oratory of John Bosco in Valdocco. He commenced his studies to become a priest in Turin in November 1866, and was ordained to the priesthood on 20 September 1873. He was appointed spiritual director at the major seminary of the diocese of Turin. In 1876 he obtained a doctorate in theology. He was appointed as the rector of the Santuario della Consolata on 2 October 1880 and he maintained that position until his death. Between 1883 and 1885 he restructured the Sanctuary and repaired the roof. In 1899 he commissioned the architect Carlo Ceppi to expand the interior space for the faithful with the construction of four circular chapels. Allamano ensured that the shrine became a source of spiritual renewal.

Allamano also responded to requests for spiritual and material comfort of Turin supporting various social initiatives and promoting the Catholic newspapers. In 1899 he began publishing the monthly La Consolata.

Consolata Missionaries
On recovering from a severe illness in 1891, he vowed to found a missionary society for priests and laymen. Thus the Consolata Missionaries was born on 29 January 1901. The first missionaries reached Kenya in 1902, joined in 1903 by the Sister of Cottolengo. He also founded the Consolata Missionary Sisters for women on 29 January 1910.

Due to the increasing size of the Christian population, it became quite clear that there were not enough priests and brethren to cater to the pastoral needs of the people. Allamano expressed this deep concern to Pope Pius X during a visit to Rome in 1912. He urged the pope to do something and perhaps establish an annual mission day to awaken missionary vocations. War breaks out in the Balkans, and the proposals is postponed. During World War I he worked to assist refugees, and seminarians drafted. He also worked on the cause of his uncle, who was beatified in 1925.

Allamano died in Turin in February 1926.

Legacy
His idea for an annual day for missionaries came in 1927 when Pope Pius XI instituted World Mission Day.

Beatification
The beatification process commenced under Pope Pius XII in 1944 and the commencement of the diocesan process in Turin conferred upon him the title Servant of God. The local process concluded its work in 1951 and received the formal decree of ratification several decades later on 5 October 1984. In 1987 the Positio was submitted to the Roman Congregation for the Causes of Saints for further evaluation.

Pope John Paul II proclaimed on 13 May 1989 that Allamano be made Venerable after he recognized that the late priest had lived a life of heroic virtue.

The miracle attributed to him for beatification was ratified on 17 October 1986 following the conclusion of a diocesan tribunal. John Paul II approved the miracle on 10 July 1990 and beatified him on 7 October 1990.

References

External links 
 Hagiography Circle
 Saints SQPN
 Pope John Paul II, Homily for the Beatification of Giuseppe Allamano, 7 October 1990, Libreria Editrice Vaticana

1851 births
1926 deaths
19th-century venerated Christians
20th-century venerated Christians
Italian beatified people
Founders of Catholic religious communities
Beatifications by Pope John Paul II
People from Castelnuovo Don Bosco
Venerated Catholics by Pope John Paul II